Michael E. Kassan (born December 11, 1950) is a digital media expert, entrepreneur, commentator, and adviser to  media companies. Kassan is the founder and CEO of MediaLink.

Biography 
After receiving his BA from UCLA, JD from Southwestern Law School and LLM-Taxation from NYU, Kassan began his career as a tax lawyer in the entertainment industry where he practiced for over 10 years.

Kassan is married to Ronnie and has three children, Alex, Brett and Adam.

Business career
After several entrepreneurial ventures,  Kassan become the largest franchisee of El Pollo Loco and Rally’s Hamburgers in Southern California, Northern California, and Nevada.

In 1986, Kassan entered the entertainment business as the President and COO of International Video Entertainment, a home video company which now comprises a large portion of Lionsgate.

In 1994, Kassan joined Initiative Media Worldwide as President/COO and Vice-Chairman. In that role, Kassan emphasized strategic management of diversified portfolios and helped grow media billings from $1.5 billion to over $10 billion.

In 1997, he was named one of the top media executives in America by Advertising Age Magazine.

In 2019, Kassan was inducted into the American Advertising Federation’s Hall of Fame, which is considered the highest honor in advertising. In 2018 was honored on Adweek’s “Power 100”  list and on Variety’s index of the 500 most influential business leaders shaping the global entertainment industry. Michael has also been named to The Hollywood Reporter’s “Silicon Beach 25” [32] list of the most powerful digital players in L.A.

MediaLink
Kassan founded MediaLink in 2003 as advertising, marketing, content, sales, service and commerce become more closely linked through technology.  In 2017, Ascential plc acquired MediaLink in a deal valued at up to $207 million, expanding the company’s purview to a global stage. It has over 125 operators working out of offices in New York City, Los Angeles, Chicago and London. The company now offers agency reviews, executive search, talent advisory, data and technology solutions, corporate and brand transformation, trade marketing and financial due diligence. In 2021, MediaLink was acquired by United Talent Agency, bringing together MediaLink’s strategic advisory services with one of the world’s largest talent agencies.

Since 2010, MediaLink has become a leader in steering large advertisers through ad agency review processes.

Media career
Michael hosts the podcast, “Good Company with Michael Kassan.” That show is produced by Kassan and the iHeartRadio Podcast Networks, and is distributed via the iHeartRadio App, Apple’s podcasts app and multiple other outlets.

Kassan is a keynote speaker, moderator and blogger.

His blog post highlighting measurement in media mix modeling prompted the radio industry to take out a full-page advert in the Wall Street Journal.

Kassan has appeared as an industry expert in Forbes, The Wall Street Journal, Ad Week, Ad Age, The New York Times, and the Los Angeles Times.

He served as a Special Adviser to Buddy Media through its ultimate acquisition by Salesforce.com.  In addition he has served as a special advisor and/or investor for a long list of media and technology startups, including Vidmob, Boostr, Mass Appeal, Wonderly and Encatos

Community involvement 
Kassan serves as Chair of the UJA-New York Marketing Communications Committee, Co-Chair of the Advertising Hall of Achievement, on the Board of the National Association of Television Program Executives, the Global Advisory Board of the Wharton Future of Advertising Program, and a Director on the Board of the Ad Council.

Kassan sits on the board of the San Diego Zoo and previously served as Chairman of the California State Senate Select Committee on the Entertainment Industry. He has been actively involved with the H.E.L.P. Group, a non-profit organization serving children with special needs, and the Big Brothers/Big Sisters program of Los Angeles.

References 

American businesspeople
Living people
1950 births